Gaspésie National Park is a provincial park located south of the town of Sainte-Anne-des-Monts, Quebec, Canada in the inland of the Gaspé peninsula. In addition, the park contains the only population of Caribou found south of the Saint Lawrence River in Canada.

Geology
There are two major and geologically distinct mountain ranges in the park. The first one, to the west of the St-Anne's River, is the Chic-Choc Mountain range. This range is 600 million years old and was mainly formed from underwater volcanic activity.
 
In contrast, the McGerrigle Mountains are much younger, only 380 million years. From the depths of the sea, magma oozed through cracks in the Earth's crust and then cooled, resulting in a large underground granite batholith. Over time, the softer sedimentary rocks above the batholith eroded away, leaving only the resistant granite. Mont Jacques-Cartier is part of this range.

Climate
Owing the area's elevation and proximity to the Saint Lawrence River, the climate of the park is very different from the lowlands of Quebec. This low temperature, combined with the lower pressure at high altitude, causes moisture to condense and fall as rain or snow; in fact, these mountains are the wettest region of Quebec.

Gallery

See also
List of Quebec provincial & national parks
National Parks of Canada
List of National Parks of Canada

External links

Official site

References

National parks of Quebec
Tourist attractions in Gaspésie–Îles-de-la-Madeleine
Hiking trails in Quebec
Protected areas of Gaspésie–Îles-de-la-Madeleine